The 42nd Annual TV Week Logie Awards was held on Sunday 30 April 2000 at the Crown Palladium in Melbourne, and broadcast on the Nine Network. The ceremony was hosted by Andrew Denton, and guests included Elle Macpherson, Ruby Wax, Savage Garden and Macy Gray.

Winners and nominees
In the tables below, winners are listed first and highlighted in bold.

Gold Logie

Acting

Most Popular Programs

Most Outstanding Programs

Performers
Macy Gray – "I Try" and "I Can't Wait to Meetchu"
Savage Garden – "Crash and Burn"

Hall of Fame
After a lifetime in Australian television, Bruce Gyngell became the 17th inductee into the TV Week Logies Hall of Fame.

References

External links
 

2000
2000 television awards
2000 in Australian television
2000 awards in Australia